Deep Creek is an unincorporated community in Twin Falls County, Idaho, United States, roughly  west of Buhl. Deep Creek had a post office 1909–1913.

Deep Creek is part of the Twin Falls, Idaho Metropolitan Statistical Area.

See also

References

Unincorporated communities in Idaho
Unincorporated communities in Twin Falls County, Idaho